The Alexander Gorchakov Public Diplomacy Fund is a Russian think tank.  The policy center was founded by President Dmitry Medvedev in 2010. The organization is closely linked to Russian Ministry of Foreign Affairs.

Notes

Think tanks based in Russia